Litšepe Leonty Marabe (born 20 February 1992) is a Mosotho professional footballer who plays as a midfielder. In 2022, Marabe moved to India and signed with Kerala Premier League side BASCO SC (Brothers Arts and Sports Club Othukkungal), before joining Transport United FC in Bhutan.

References

External links 
 

1992 births
Living people
Association football midfielders
Lesotho footballers
Lesotho international footballers